Richard Albert may refer to:
 Richard Albert (composer) (born 1983), German composer and songwriter
 Richard Albert (field hockey) (born 1963), Canadian former field hockey player
 Richard L. Albert, president of the motion picture advertising agency Design Projects, Inc.